Johaar is a 2020 Indian Telugu-language anthology drama film directed by Teja Marni in his debut and starring Esther Anil, Ankith Koyya, Naina Ganguly, Easwari Rao, Chaitanya Krishna and Subhalekha Sudhakar. The film streamed on Aha on 15 August 2020.

Plot
Johaar is an anthology film which revolves around 5 different stories:

Ganga, widowed woman who is saving up for her daughter's health operation, Bala, a street performer but a good athlete.

A student Jyothi  who elopes with a Tea stall boy siddu because of her mother being a prostitute.

A man Bose who runs a hostel for orphans and is waiting for funds from the government.
And the son of chief minister who becomes chief minister after his father's death who dreams of building his father's statue as the biggest statue in the world.Therefore, for building the statue he stops all the funds for a widowed mother whose crop is damaged by rain thus, she couldn't give money for her daughter's operation, scholarship of that girl, loan for that tea boy who aspires to start a business, funds for that athlete and funds for the hostel and finally their lives get ruined.

A journalist who narrates all this story to the chief minister claims that he is responsible for all the deaths and the chief minister with guilty opens the statue in climax.

Cast 

 Esther Anil as Jyothi
 Ankith Koyya as Siddhu 
 Naina Ganguly as Bala, Street performer 
 Eshwari Rao as Ganga
 Chaitanya Krishna as Vijay Varma
 Subhalekha Sudhakar as Bose
 Rohini
 Chalapathi Rao

Production 
Child artist Esther Anil made her lead Telugu debut as an adult with this film after Drushyam.

Release 
The Hindu wrote that "It's a commendable attempt, even though it isn't wholly convincing". The Times of India gave the film a rating of three out of five stars and wrote that "But barring minimal flaws, Teja Marni's Johaar is a raw and bold statement on the political scenario in the country today. And that makes it worth a watch!".

References

External links 

2020 films
2020 drama films
Indian drama films
2020s Telugu-language films
Films set in Andhra Pradesh
Films shot in Varanasi
Films shot in Andhra Pradesh
Films shot in Visakhapatnam
Aha (streaming service) original films